Torre San Giovanni di Ugento Lighthouse is an active lighthouse located in Torre San Giovanni, in front of the Marina, on the south-western coast of the Salento Peninsula, on the Ionian Sea.

Description
The lighthouse is completely automated and is managed by the Marina Militare with the identification code number 3310 E.F.

See also
 List of lighthouses in Italy
 Torre San Giovanni

References

External links
 Servizio Fari Marina Militare

Lighthouses in Italy
Lighthouses completed in 1932
Buildings and structures in the Province of Lecce